Sekwati was a 19th-century paramount King of the Maroteng or more commonly known as the Bapedi people. His reign focused on rebuilding the Pedi Kingdom on the conclusion of the Mfecane and maintaining peaceful relations with the Boer Voortrekkers and neighbouring chiefdoms in the north-eastern Transvaal. He was the father to rivals Sekhukhune I who took over the Marota/Pedi paramountcy by force and Mampuru II, his rightful successor.

By the death of his father Thulare I in 1824, the Marota or Pedi Kingdom was in a state of despair due to the turbulence caused by the Mfecane ("the crushing") or Difeqane ("the scattering") and encroaching white settlers (Boers) into the Transvaal. Sekwati came into power after the death of his older brothers who were killed during raids by Mzilikazi's Matabele. To rebuild the empire he moved his capital from Phiring to Thaba Mosego.

Bibliography 
 Peter Nicholas St. Martin Delius, The Pedi Polity Under Sekwati and Sekhukhune, 1828-1880, University of London (School of Oriental and African Studies). 
 Barbara Oomen, Chiefs in South Africa: Law, Power & Culture in the Post-apartheid Era, University of KwazuluNatal Press, 2005.

See also 
 Mampuru II
 Sekhukhune I 
 Sekhukhune II
 Pedi people

References 

African royalty
African kings
1861 deaths
Year of birth missing
History of South Africa
History of Africa